Chi Beta Phi is a professional fraternity in the field of science.

History
Chi Beta Phi was founded in April, 1916 at Randolph–Macon College.  It recognizes a sole founder in John Howard Greene.  The fraternity's purpose was to promote interest in sciences using reviews of current investigations, by promoting lectures by prominent scientists, distributing papers prepared by its members, and general discussion.  The Fraternity existed as a local organization for four years, but began to expand during the 1921-22 school year, when three additional chapters were added.

By 1925, individual chapter names were determined, a constitution and national program was developed, and the fraternity was on its way to opening 33 chapters over the next century.  

Chi Beta Phi was a charterer of the Professional Interfraternity Conference, but has since withdrawn its membership.

Chi Beta Phi was named an affiliate of the American Association for the Advancement of Science (AAAS) in 1935.

Traditions and insignia
Chi Beta Phi's official colors are Colonial blue and Crimson.

Its coat of arms is a shield, draped and showing beveled edges.  At upper left, on the shield is an electrode, to symbolize the science of Physics.  At upper right is placed a microscope, to symbolize both Biology and Psychology.  At the top of the crest is a star to symbolize both Astronomy and Math.  The Computer Sciences are alluded to by its surrounding rays. At the lower portion of the crest are two retorts, to symbolize Geology and Chemistry.  The letters of the fraternity are placed across the center, and the motto is on the ribbon below.

The motto of the Fraternity is Scientia Omnia Vincit, or in English, Science Conquers All.

The official flower is the Cape jasmine, and the official tree is the Ginkgo biloba.

Chapters
These are the chapters of Chi Beta Phi.  Chapters noted in bold are active, chapters in italics are dormant.

References

Student organizations established in 1916
1916 establishments in Virginia
Former members of Professional Fraternity Association